The Ngaro are an Australian Aboriginal group of people who traditionally inhabited the Whitsunday Islands and coastal regions of Queensland, employing a seafaring lifestyle in an area that archaeologically shows evidence of human habitation since 9000 BP. Ngaro society was destroyed by warfare with traders, colonists, and the Australian Native Police. The Native Police Corps forcibly relocated the remaining Ngaro people in 1870 to a penal colony on Palm Island or to the lumber mills of Brampton Island as forced labourers.

Language

There is some doubt about the status of the language, now extinct, of the Ngaro people. It may have been the same as the Wiri language or Giya language (both dialects of Biri), or a separate dialect.

Country
Their inland extension reached as far as the mountains to the east of Proserpine. Tindale's mapping was influential but is contested by descendants of several related groups in the area. South Molle Island was an important quarry for materials used in stone manufacture, and Nara Inlet on Hook Island affords archaeologists insights into the earliest Ngaro habitation in this area.

The Gia people and language have also been assigned Ngaro as a synonym, and vice versa, but it appears that the Gia lived on the mainland.

, a Traditional Owner Reference Group consisting of representatives of the Yuwibara, Koinmerburra, Barada Barna, Wiri, Ngaro, and those Gia and Juru people whose lands are within Reef Catchments Mackay Whitsunday Isaac region, helps to support natural resource management and look after the cultural heritage sites in the area.

Social organisation
The Ngaro were divided into kin groups; the name of at least one is known:
 Googaburra

Lifestyle

Whitsunday Island formed the centre of Ngaro life, furnishing the only permanent area of habitation. The Ngaro were noted for their distinctive sewn three-piece canoes, crafted from ironbark and known as winta. Despite assertions, notably by Alfred Cort Haddon, that outrigger technology never reached further down the east Queensland coast that 300 miles north of Whitsunday Islands, the entries in Captain James Cook's Endeavour journals prove that by 1770, the first contact date with Europeans, outriggers were already employed in this area.
On these the Ngaro made their journeys and fishing expeditions, sailing not only about the islands in their immediate area but covering an estimated 100 kilometres in and along the reefs, including those between St.Bees and Hayman Island, reefs which they knew intimately. Ngaro oral accounts are consistent throughout the historical record in their description of seasonal visits to the Great Barrier Reef, 43 miles from the mainland and 25 miles from the nearest island, in their canoes.

Their diet consisted of sea turtles, flying foxes, fowls, wild cherries, Burdekin plum, damson berries, trochus shells, baler shells, green ant and cockatoo apples. They also hunted large sea mammals such as small whales from these canoes. This was only possible due to their development of barbed harpoon technology that enabled the Ngaro to kill their prey by exhausting them rather than bleeding them to death, which would attract sharks to compete for the catch..

The Ngaro traded with the mainland, and their artifacts such as baler shells for carrying water, and juan knives fashioned from rock at South Molle, which had one of the largest of such pre-European quarries in Australia, found their way a good distance inland and far up the coast.

Rock art
The earliest archaeological evidence for habitation in the area has been found at Nara Inlet on Hook Island. Cave openings and nearby mounds, or middens, of oyster-like shells are still visible in the steep slopes of Nara Inlet.

The painting of a hashed oval shape is often presumed to be a sea turtle shell, a prominent food source for the Ngaro and Aboriginal people of the mainland. However, it may represent the fruit of the pandanus plant and its seed.

History of contact
Early settler accounts suggest that the Ngaro population consisted of about 100 people, which represents an island population density of roughly one person per . They may have been decimated through early contacts by disease, but this figure still represents a comparatively high figure. Derrick Stone writes of their fate as white colonisation penetrated their area:

'Warfare, colonist expansion, disease and the Native Police Corps made their existence tenuous but the Aborigines' final downfall came in 1870 when they were forcibly relocated to a mission settlement on Palm Island and others to Brampton Island to work in timber mills.

Memories of old songs sung in a mixture of Ngaro and Biri are still recalled by descendants.

Alternative names
 Ngalangi
 Googaburra

Some words
 winta (canoe)

Notes

Citations

Sources

 
 

Aboriginal peoples of Queensland
Whitsunday Islands